Gyula Mazur (4 April 1888 – 26 November 1953) was a Hungarian cyclist. He competed in two events at the 1912 Summer Olympics.

References

External links
 

1888 births
1953 deaths
Hungarian male cyclists
Olympic cyclists of Hungary
Cyclists at the 1912 Summer Olympics
Cyclists from Budapest